James Tildesley (7 October 1881 – January 1963) was an English professional football right back who played in the Football League for Middlesbrough, Newcastle United and Leeds City.

Personal life 
Tildesley served as a private in the Army Service Corps during the First World War.

Career statistics

References 

English Football League players
Newcastle United F.C. players
English footballers
British Army personnel of World War I
Association football fullbacks
1881 births
1963 deaths
Royal Army Service Corps soldiers
People from Halesowen
Middlesbrough F.C. players
Luton Town F.C. players
Leeds City F.C. players